GEMS (Graded English Medium School) is a private school, established in 1984 AD in Lalitpur, Nepal, 1.5 kilometers from Satdobato point on the Ring road, running classes from grades 1 to 10. Owing to its long history of teaching experience, the school has long been regarded as one of the best in the country.

History
With a view to providing Nepalese children with a good education in the English Medium in Nepal itself rather than sending them to Schools in the hill stations of India, Little Flowers' English School was established in Jhapa by Mr. Rajesh Khadka in 1981 A.D. Inspired by its success, GEMS was established by Mr. Khadka in 1984 A.D. in a rented house in Sanepa Height, Lalitpur with 78 students and 25 faculty members. A few years later, the school was expanded to be housed in Kiran Bhawan, Sanepa.

The school bought its own land in Dhapakhel with an area of around 14 acres where it planned to construct its own state-of-the-art learning complex to expand its rented space in Sanepa. In August 2000 A.D after the construction was completed, it shifted the classes of grades 4 through 10 were to be run in the Dhapakhel complex. The classes for grades 1 through 3 continued to be held in the Kiran Bhawan complex till 2019 when all the classes finally shifted to the Dhapakhel complex. 

In 2008, the school introduced a higher education section, Gems Institute of Higher Education (GIHE) where the GCE A-Level program, affiliated with Cambridge Assessment International Education and the Plus Two program, affiliated with the Higher Secondary Education Board (HSEB), Nepal, were offered.

References

External links 
 http://www.gems.edu.np/aboutus?url=who-we-are

 Secondary schools in Nepal
 Boarding schools in Nepal
1984 establishments in Nepal